Edward Hull may refer to:

 Edward Hull (cricketer) (1879-1947), Jamaican cricketer
 Edward Hull (geologist) (1829–1917), Irish geologist
 Edward Hull (knight) (c. 1410 -1 1453), English knight
 Edward Hull (watercolourist) (1823–1906), British illustrator and watercolour painter